Terry W. "Roscoe" Ruskowski (born December 31, 1954) is a Canadian former professional ice hockey centre and coach, who played for the Chicago Black Hawks, Los Angeles Kings, Pittsburgh Penguins, and Minnesota North Stars in the National Hockey League (NHL), and for the Houston Aeros and Winnipeg Jets of the World Hockey Association (WHA). Ruskowski's leadership on the ice was recognized with his tenure as captain of the Aeros, Blackhawks, Kings, and Penguins, the only player in major professional history to captain four clubs.

As a coach, Ruskowski was most recently the head coach and general manager for the Quad City Mallards of the ECHL.

Coaching career
In 2001, Ruskowski was named the head coach of the Laredo Bucks in Laredo, Texas, of the Central Hockey League. On March 18, 2009, he secured his 500th coaching win, as the Bucks defeated the Texas Brahmas of Fort Worth, 4-3, in the Southern Conference playoffs.

In 2007, Ruskowski entered the final year of a four-year contract extension with the Bucks. Ruskowski told the Laredo Morning Times that his tenure was in the hands of Bucks chairman Glenn Hart, owner Julian "Kiki" DeAyala, and team president John Beckelhymer and that he had "full faith" that he will obtain his third contract with the club. He was shortly thereafter given a "lifetime contract" as the coach of the Bucks.

Ruskowski led the Bucks to the postseason in seven of his years as head coach. The team won President Cup championships in 2004 and 2006 and four consecutive Southern Conference titles. Ruskowski became a well-known figure in the Laredo community. On June 3, 2010, Ruskowski was named a Paul Harris Fellow by Laredo Rotary International in a ceremony at Texas A&M University.

In May 2011, Ruskowski announced his resignation after ten years as the coach of the Bucks. The decision to step down despite a lifetime contract came after declining attendance and depressed revenues to the Bucks. Ruskowski had compiled a 343–175–56 overall record in Laredo and was the CHL "Coach of the Year" during the 2005–06 season. A year after Ruskowski's departure from the Bucks, the team, citing declining attendance and revenue reversals, disbanded.

On June 28, 2011, Ruskowski became the coach of the Rio Grande Valley Killer Bees hockey team, based in McAllen, a staunch rival of the Laredo Bucks. Ruskowski had a two-year contract with the Bees.

Ruskowski became the head coach and general manager of the Quad City Mallards in the ECHL in the 2013–14 season. On January 20, 2017, he was relieved of his duties.

Honours
In 2010, Ruskowski was elected as an inaugural inductee into the World Hockey Association Hall of Fame.

Career statistics

Personal life 
Born  in Prince Albert, Saskatchewan, Ruskowski began his junior hockey career in Humboldt, Saskatchewan, in the Saskatchewan Junior Hockey League (SJHL - Tier II) in 1970–71, playing for the Humboldt Broncos. His leadership ability at age sixteen was evident, as was his ability and toughness. He helped to propel the Broncos to the league final that year.

From 1971 to 1974, Ruskowski played for the Swift Current Broncos where he became captain in his second and third year and helped to lead the team until it lost in the semi-finals in 1974. As well, he still holds the team record for most assists in one year, 93 assists in 1973–74. He could be expected to stick up for his teammates, a situation which led to many fighting penalties each year.

Ruskowski is married and has two daughters.

References

External links

Hockey Hall of Fame
Hockey Draft Central
 

1954 births
Living people
Canadian Christians
Canadian ice hockey centres
Canadian ice hockey coaches
Chicago Blackhawks captains
Chicago Blackhawks draft picks
Chicago Blackhawks players
Houston Aeros draft picks
Houston Aeros (WHA) players
Ice hockey people from Saskatchewan
Los Angeles Kings players
Minnesota North Stars players
Pittsburgh Penguins players
Saskatoon Blades coaches
Sportspeople from Prince Albert, Saskatchewan
Winnipeg Jets (WHA) players